"Baby Love" is a 1964 song recorded by the Supremes.

Baby Love may also refer to:

Films
 Baby Love (1968 film), a 1968 film starring Linda Hayden, Ann Lynn, Keith Barron and Diana Dors
 Baby Love (1984 film), the fourth sequel to Lemon Popsicle, produced by Menahem Golan and Yoram Globus
 Baby Love (1995 film), a Philippine film directed by Peque Gallaga
 Baby Love (2008 film), French film

Music
 "Baby Love", released in 1977 by Mother's Finest
 "Baby Love" (Regina song), a 1986 song by Regina, notably covered by Dannii Minogue in 1991
 "Baby Love", a song by Joan Osborne from her 2000 album Righteous Love
 "Baby Love", a song by Stephanie Mills from her 2004 album Born for This!
 "Baby Love/Yakusoku", a 2006 maxi-single, the soundtrack from the anime Kyo no Gononi
 "Baby Love" (Nicole Scherzinger song), a 2007 song by Nicole Scherzinger

Other
 Baby Love (1981), the first novel by Joyce Maynard
 Baby Love (manga), a 1996–1999 manga by Ayumi Shiina
 Baby Love: Choosing Motherhood After a Lifetime of Ambivalence, a 2007 memoir by Rebecca Walker
 Walt "Baby" Love, radio personality and minister
 Baby Love, lead singer and rapper of Rock Steady Crew
 Walter Afanasieff a.k.a. "Baby Love", Russian-American songwriter and producer
 Baby Love (Jacqueline Wilson novel), a 2022 young adult novel by Jacqueline Wilson